Madani Camara (born March 30, 1987) is an Ivorian football player. He currently plays for JS Kabylie in the Algerian Ligue Professionnelle 1.

Club career
Camara began his career with Vallée Athletic Club de Bouaké in the Côte d'Ivoire Second Division. In 2009, he joined Algerian club MC El Eulma where he spent two seasons and a half seasons.

On June 26, 2011, Camara signed a three year contract with JS Kabylie.

International career
Camara has represented Ivory Coast at the Under-20 and Under-23 level.

References

External links
 DZFoot Profile
 

1987 births
Living people
Algerian Ligue Professionnelle 1 players
Ivorian footballers
Ivorian expatriate footballers
Expatriate footballers in Algeria
MC El Eulma players
JS Kabylie players
Ivorian expatriate sportspeople in Algeria
Ivory Coast under-20 international footballers
Association football midfielders